The Far North District is the northernmost territorial authority district of New Zealand, consisting of the northern part of the Northland Peninsula in the North Island. It stretches from North Cape and Cape Reinga / Te Rerenga Wairua in the north, down to the Bay of Islands, the Hokianga and the town of Kaikohe.

The Far North District Council is based in Kaikohe, and has nine ward councillors representing three wards: Te Hiku (in the north), Kaikohe/Hokianga (in the west), Bay of Islands/Whangaroa (in the east). The council is led by the current mayor of Far North, Moko Tepania, who entered the role in 2022.

Geography 

The Far North District is the largest of three territorial authorities making up the Northland Region. The district stretches from the capes and bays at the northern tip of the Aupouri Peninsula past Ninety Mile Beach to the main body of the Northland Peninsula, where it encompasses the Parengarenga Harbour, Whangaroa Harbour and Bay of Islands (on the east coast) and Hokianga (on the west coast).

It borders on the Kaipara and Whangarei Districts, which are the other two territorial authorities in the Northland Region.

Population 

Far North District had a population of 65,250 at the 2018 New Zealand census, an increase of 9,516 people (17.1%) since the 2013 census, and an increase of 9,405 people (16.8%) since the 2006 census. There were 32,595 males and 32,655 females living in 22,761 households. The median age was 43.2 years (compared with 37.4 years nationally), with 14,079 people (21.6%) aged under 15 years, 10,353 (15.9%) aged 15 to 29, 28,191 (43.2%) aged 30 to 64, and 12,624 (19.3%) aged 65 or older.

Ethnicities were 64.2% European/Pākehā, 48.3% Māori, 4.8% Pacific peoples, 3.0% Asian, and 1.5% other ethnicities. People may identify with more than one ethnicity.

The percentage of people born overseas was 14.8, compared with 27.1% nationally.

Although some people objected to giving their religion, 45.6% had no religion, 37.7% were Christian, 6.3% had Māori religious beliefs, 0.5% were Hindu, 0.2% were Muslim, 0.5% were Buddhist and 1.5% had other religions.

Of those at least 15 years old, 6,771 (13.2%) people had a bachelor or higher degree, and 10,965 (21.4%) people had no formal qualifications. The median income was $22,600, compared with $31,800 nationally. 4,581 people (9.0%) earned over $70,000 compared to 17.2% nationally. The employment status of those at least 15 was that 20,163 (39.4%) people were employed full-time, 7,824 (15.3%) were part-time, and 3,387 (6.6%) were unemployed.

Urban areas and settlements 
The Far North District has eight towns with a population over 1,000. Together they are home to % of the district's population.

The northernmost town in the district is Kaitaia. Kerikeri, Moerewa, Kawakawa, Paihia, Opua and Russell are clustered on the east coast around the Bay of Islands with Kaikohe centrally situated to their west. Another cluster of small settlements, Ōmāpere, Opononi, Rawene, Panguru, Kohukohu, and Horeke, surrounds the Hokianga Harbour on the west coast.

References

External links 

 Far North District Council official website